Jhoola may refer to:

 Jhoola (1941 film)
 Jhoola (1962 film)
 Swing (seat)
 Jhoola, Nancowry, a village in India